Parachimarrhis is a monotypic genus of flowering plants belonging to the family Rubiaceae. Its sole species is Parachimarrhis breviloba, native to southern Tropical America.

References

Dialypetalantheae
Rubiaceae genera
Taxa named by Adolpho Ducke